Francisco António Galinho Caló (5 September 1946 – 12 July 2021) was a Portuguese professional footballer who played as a central defender.

Club career
Born in Montemor-o-Novo, Évora District, Caló joined Sporting CP in 1965 at the age of 18. He was irregularly used in his seven-year spell with the Lisbon club, also being loaned to fellow Primeira Liga team U.F.C.I. Tomar in the 1968–69 season.

Caló contributed a total of 30 games and one goal to two national championship conquests, in 1966 and 1970. He also won the 1971 Taça de Portugal against S.L. Benfica, losing two finals against the same adversary, and retired professionally at only 29 after one-year stints with two other sides in the country's capital, Atlético Clube de Portugal and G.D. Estoril Praia.

International career
Calón earned one cap for Portugal, appearing in a 2–1 loss against Scotland in Glasgow for the UEFA Euro 1972 qualifiers, on 13 October 1971.

Death
Caló died on 12 July 2021 at the age of 74, from unknown causes.

References

External links

1946 births
2021 deaths
People from Montemor-o-Novo
Sportspeople from Évora District
Portuguese footballers
Association football defenders
Primeira Liga players
Sporting CP footballers
U.F.C.I. Tomar players
Atlético Clube de Portugal players
G.D. Estoril Praia players
Portugal youth international footballers
Portugal under-21 international footballers
Portugal international footballers